The 2014–15 Wellington Phoenix FC season was the club's eighth season since its establishment in 2007. The club participated in the A-League for the eighth time and the FFA Cup for the first time. Wellington Phoenix also competed in New Zealand's domestic league, the ASB Premiership, with a reserves squad for the first time.

Players

Squad information

Transfers in

Transfers out

Technical staff

Statistics

Squad statistics

|-
|colspan="24"|Players no longer at the club:

Pre-season and friendlies

Competitions

Overall

A-League

League table

Results summary

Results by round

Matches

Finals series

FFA Cup

ASB Premiership

League table

Results summary

Results by round

Matches

References

External links
 Official Website

Wellington Phoenix
Wellington Phoenix FC seasons